Matt Zultek (born March 12, 1979) is a Canadian former professional ice hockey player who was drafted in the first round, 15th overall, by the Los Angeles Kings in the 1997 NHL Entry Draft. The Kings had acquired this selection from the St. Louis Blues as part of the 1996 Wayne Gretzky trade. The Kings were unable to sign him to a contract, and he was redrafted in 1999 by the Boston Bruins. 

Zultek never played in the National Hockey League, and most recently played for the Toledo Storm (ECHL) in 2006-07 and the Rapid City Rush (CHL) 2008-09. From 2009 to 2011 he played for the Mississippi Surge (SPHL).

Zultek scored the 1999 Memorial Cup winning goal for the Ottawa 67's against the Calgary Hitmen.

Career statistics

References

External links

1979 births
Living people
Boston Bruins draft picks
Canadian ice hockey left wingers
Greenville Grrrowl players
Ice hockey people from Ontario
Los Angeles Kings draft picks
Manitoba Moose players
National Hockey League first-round draft picks
Ottawa 67's players
Philadelphia Phantoms players
St. Thomas (New Brunswick) Tommies ice hockey players
Sportspeople from Mississauga
Springfield Falcons players
Toledo Storm players
Trenton Titans players
Rapid City Rush players
Mississippi Surge players